Bučany is a municipality of Trnava District in the Trnava region of Slovakia.

Genealogical resources

The records for genealogical research are available at the state archive "Statny Archiv in Bratislava, Nitra, Slovakia"

 Roman Catholic church records (births/marriages/deaths): 1711-1895 (parish A)
 Lutheran church records (births/marriages/deaths): 1792-1928 (parish B)

See also
 List of municipalities and towns in Slovakia

External links
https://web.archive.org/web/20071217080336/http://www.statistics.sk/mosmis/eng/run.html
Surnames of living people in Bucany

References
 

Villages and municipalities in Trnava District